Johann Leonhard Frisch (19 March 1666 – 21 March 1743) was a German linguist, entomologist and ornithologist.

External links
 Gaedike, R.; Groll, E. K. & Taeger, A. 2012: Bibliography of the entomological literature from the beginning until 1863 : online database - version 1.0 - Senckenberg Deutsches Entomologisches Institut.

1666 births
1743 deaths
German entomologists
German ornithologists